HD 49878 is a single star in the northern circumpolar constellation of Camelopardalis. It has an orange hue and is faintly visible to the naked eye with an apparent visual magnitude of +4.55. The star is located at a distance of approximately 184 light years from the Sun, as determined from its parallax. It is drifting closer with a radial velocity of −29.5 km/s. The star has been listed as a candidate member of the Wolf 630 moving group, but is most likely a field star.

This is an aging giant star with a stellar classification of K4 III, having exhausted the supply of hydrogen at its core and expanded to 19 times the Sun's radius. It is roughly 5 billion years old with 1.2 times the mass of the Sun. The star is radiating 94 times the luminosity of the Sun from its enlarged photosphere at an effective temperature of 4,160 K. It is spinning slowly with a projected rotational velocity of 1.4 km/s.

References

External links
HR 2527
Image M Camelopardalis

K-type giants
Camelopardalis (constellation)
Camelopardalis, M
Durchmusterung objects
049878
033694
2527